Black Mesa may refer to:

Places in the United States 
 Black Mesa (Oklahoma), in Colorado, New Mexico, and the highest point in Oklahoma
 Black Mesa Test Range, a United States Army rocket testing facility in Utah
 Black Mesa (Apache-Navajo Counties, Arizona), an upland coal-bearing mesa, mountainous area in Navajo and Apache Counties, Arizona
 Black Mesa Peabody Coal controversy, the controversy surrounding a Peabody Coal mine in the Black Mesa (Apache-Navajo Counties, Arizona)
 Black Mesa (Navajo County, Arizona), in the White Mountains
 Black Mesa (Warm Springs, Arizona), a southern section of Black Mountains (Arizona) containing the Warm Springs Wilderness, and setting for the 1936 film The Petrified Forest

In the Half-Life video game series 
 Black Mesa Research Facility, a fictional scientific research complex in New Mexico that forms the setting for the video game Half-Life and the game with the same name.
 Black Mesa East, a fictional resistance base in Eastern Europe, featured in Half-Life 2
 Black Mesa (video game), a remake of the video game Half-Life

See also 
  List of peaks named Black Mesa, a comprehensive listing of summits named "Black Mesa"

ru:Black Mesa